The 2018 Queensland Reds season was the club's 22nd season since the inception of Super Rugby in 1996.

Squad

Current squad

The Queensland Reds squad for the 2018 season:

Transfers

In:

Out:

Season summary

Season results

Standings

Statistics

References

External links
 Reds Official website
 Australia Super Rugby website
 SANZAR website

2018
2018 Super Rugby season by team
2018 in Australian rugby union